Alison Duke is a Canadian film director, producer, and writer. She is the co-founder and director of Oya Media.

Biography
She is a graduate of the University of Windsor from where she earned a master's degree in 1991. She also holds a master's in film production from York University.

Alison started her career in 1996 as a producer and worked for several organizations including CHUM Television.

In 2001, her first feature film, Raisin' Kane, was released.

In 2018, she founded Oya Media with some fellow artists.

Filmography
 Raisin' Kane
 Mr. Jane and Finch - Winston LaRose
 Bam Bam: The Story of Sister Nancy
 21 Black Futures: The Prescription
 Promise Me
 A Deathly Silence

Award and recognition
 Donald Brittain Award (2020)
 Mentorship Award presented at the Women in Film & Television-Toronto (WIFT)

References

Year of birth missing (living people)
Living people
Canadian documentary film producers
Canadian women film producers
York University alumni
University of Windsor alumni
Black Canadian filmmakers
Black Canadian women